Charlotte Raven (born 1969) is a British author and journalist. She studied English at the University of Manchester. As a Labour Club activist there in the late 1980s and early 1990s, she was part of a successful campaign to oust then student union communications officer Derek Draper, though she subsequently had a four-year relationship with him. She was University of Manchester Students' Union Women's Officer in 1990-91 and presided over an election in which Liam Byrne MP failed to be elected as the Union's Welfare Officer. She later studied at the University of Sussex.

Raven was a contributor to the Modern Review, and the editor of the relaunched version in 1997. There she met Julie Burchill, with whom she had an affair in 1995: the two are pictured in the National Portrait Gallery. Her columns have appeared frequently in The Guardian and New Statesman.

In 2001 Raven was accused of regional 'racism' after launching an attack on Denise Fergus, the mother of child murder victim James Bulger, and the people of Liverpool in general, in a Guardian article on the James Bulger case. The article generated a high level of complaints. In response, Guardian readers' editor Ian Mayes concluded that the article should not have been published.

In April 2013, it was announced that the feminist magazine Spare Rib would relaunch with Raven as the editor. It was subsequently announced that while a magazine and website were to be launched, it would now have a different name.

Personal life 
She and her partner the film maker Tom Sheahan have a daughter, Anna, born in 2004 and a son, John, who was born in 2009.

In January 2010 she revealed that she had been diagnosed with Huntington's disease, an incurable hereditary disease, in January 2006 and had been contemplating suicide, an option she rejected after visiting a clinic in an area of Venezuela with a very high incidence of Huntington's Disease. In 2019 she became patient 1 on the Roche Gen-Peak trial of a huntingtin protein-lowering drug tominersen. In 2021 she published a memoir, Patient 1, with her doctor Edward Wild on the experience of coming to terms with the diagnosis, the drug trial and the living with the illness as it affected her mind and body. Raven was shortlisted for the 2022 Royal Society of Literature Christopher Bland Prize for the book.

Recognition
She was recognized as one of the BBC's 100 women of 2013.

References

External links 
 Charlotte Raven columns and reviews from The Guardian and The Observer
 Articles by Charlotte Raven from New Statesman
 Portrait of Raven (right) and Julie Burchill at the website of the National Portrait Gallery

1969 births
Alumni of the Victoria University of Manchester
Bisexual feminists
Bisexual women
British bisexual writers
British feminists
Place of birth missing (living people)
British journalists
British Trotskyists
English LGBT writers
Living people
Alliance for Workers' Liberty people
BBC 100 Women